Clivia is a 1954 West German musical film directed by Karl Anton and starring Claude Farell, Peter Pasetti and Paul Dahlke. It is an adaptation of the 1933 operetta Clivia by Nico Dostal and is part of the subgenre of operetta films. It was shot at the Spandau Studios in Berlin and on location in Mallorca. The film's sets were designed by the art directors Karl Weber and Erich Grave.

Synopsis
In order for her revue troupe to be able to enter a South American country singer Clivia marries a local cattle baron. However, it turns out that troupe's leader has plans to over the country's president.

Cast

References

Bibliography

External links 
 

1954 films
1954 musical films
German musical films
West German films
1950s German-language films
Films directed by Karl Anton
Films based on operettas
Operetta films
Films set in South America
German black-and-white films
Films shot in Spain
Films shot at Spandau Studios
1950s German films